Misbegotten is a 1997 film directed by Mark L. Lester.

Plot summary
A killer who is obsessed with fathering a child, but has troubles with relationships with women, becomes a father via artificial insemination. He then tracks the woman down and terrorizes her and her husband.

Cast
 Kevin Dillon as Billy Crapshoot
 Nick Mancuso as Paul Bourke
 Lysette Anthony as Caitlan Bourke
 Mark Holden as Captain

Production
Filming occurred during mid-1997 in Britannia Beach, British Columbia.

Rating
The film was rated R when released.

Reception
The film received generally poor reviews, with TVguide.com giving it only one and a half stars.

References

External links

1997 films
American thriller films
Films directed by Mark L. Lester
1990s thriller films
Films with screenplays by Larry Cohen
1990s English-language films
1990s American films